Nagolnoye is a rural locality (a selo) and the administrative center of Nagolenskoye Rural Settlement, Rovensky District, Belgorod Oblast, Russia. The population was 1,080 as of 2010. There are 8 streets.

Geography 
Nagolnoye is located 10 km northeast of Rovenki (the district's administrative centre) by road. Klimenkovo is the nearest rural locality.

References 

Rural localities in Rovensky District, Belgorod Oblast